Omega Rho is the scholastic honor society of the Institute for Operations Research and the Management Sciences that recognizes academic achievement among students in the fields of operations research and management science.

History 
The society was founded at the TIMS/ORSA Meeting in Philadelphia, Pennsylvania, April 1, 1976, and admitted to the Association of College Honor Societies in 1983 with full membership in 1986.

Membership is open to both undergraduates and graduate students, along with faculty.  Additionally, 42 leaders in the field have been granted honorary membership.

Omega Rho honor society has 39 active chapters across the United States and a total membership of approximately 8,100.

Chapters

Public symbolism 
The colors of Omega Rho are Blue and Red.
The symbols of the Society are explained in its Bylaws as being a saddle projection (~3D model) superimposed by a tapered, red arrow.

Leadership 
 President, M.K. Jeong, Rutgers University
 Immediate past-president, W. Art Chaovalitwongse, University of Arkansas, Fayetteville
 President-elect, 
 Secretary, Yahya Fathi, North Carolina State University
 Treasurer, Christopher M. Rump, Bowling Green State University

Regional directors
 Northeastern North America:  Chun-An(Joe) Chou, Northeastern University
 Southeastern North America: Tao Hong, University of North Carolina at Charlotte
 Central North America: Lewis Ntaimo, Texas A&M University
 Western North America: David Kim, Oregon State University
 Africa: open position
 Asia-Pacific: open position
 Central and South America: open position
 Europe: ManMohan Sodhi, City University, London, United Kingdom

See also
 Association of College Honor Societies
 INFORMS Journal on Applied Analytics

References

External links
 
 INFORMS website
 ACHS Omega Rho entry
 Omega Rho chapter list at ACHS

Association of College Honor Societies
Honor societies
Student organizations established in 1976
1976 establishments in Pennsylvania